Braian Alejandro Guille (born 31 July 1997) is an Argentine professional footballer who plays as a forward for Club Olimpo.

Career

Club
Guille had a period of his youth career with Atlético Rivadavia before joining Racing Club. He first appeared in the Racing Club senior squad in March and April 2017, being an unused substitute for leagues matches against Godoy Cruz and Temperley. In the following May, he made his professional debut in an Argentine Primera División defeat away to Independiente. On 23 August 2017, Santamarina of Primera B Nacional loaned Guille. He scored in his first Santamarina appearance, netting in a loss to Aldosivi. One goal in eighteen further fixtures followed. Guille joined Brown on loan in June 2018.

On 10 January 2019, having terminated his loan with Brown days prior, Guille was loaned to Defensores de Belgrano.

International
He was selected by Argentina at U20 level for the 2016 COTIF Tournament, but he didn't make an appearance.

Career statistics
.

References

External links

1997 births
Living people
Sportspeople from Buenos Aires Province
Argentine footballers
Association football forwards
Argentine Primera División players
Primera Nacional players
Torneo Federal A players
Racing Club de Avellaneda footballers
Club y Biblioteca Ramón Santamarina footballers
Club Atlético Brown footballers
Defensores de Belgrano footballers
Olimpo footballers